Altica ambiens, the alder flea beetle, is a species of flea beetle in the family Chrysomelidae. It is found in North America.

Subspecies
 Altica ambiens alni Harris in Scudder, 1869
 Altica ambiens ambiens J. L. LeConte, 1859

References

Further reading

 
 
 
 
 

Alticini
Beetles described in 1859
Taxa named by John Lawrence LeConte